8034 Akka, provisional designation , is a sub-kilometer sized, eccentric asteroid and near-Earth object of the Apollo group, approximately 540 meters in diameter. It was discovered at Palomar Observatory in 1992, and named after Akka from Finnish mythology.

Discovery 

Akka was discovered by American astronomer couple Carolyn and Eugene Shoemaker at the Palomar Observatory, California, on 3 June 1992. The discovery was made as the asteroid neared a close approach to Earth the following month at 12.1 million kilometers or 31.5 lunar distances (LD).

Orbit and classification 

Akka orbits the Sun at a distance of 1.1–2.6 AU once every 2 years and 6 months (904 days). Its orbit has an eccentricity of 0.41 and an inclination of 2° with respect to the ecliptic. The first observation was made at Siding Spring Observatory in May 1992, extending the asteroid's observation arc by just two weeks prior to its discovery.

Close approaches 

Akka frequently makes close approaches to Earth and Mars. Its closest recorded approach to Earth and Mars is 0.081 AU on 29 July 1992 and 0.061 AU on 26 April 1982, respectively. It will make its closest approach to another planet when it comes within 0.044 AU of Mars on 6 April 2171.

Physical characteristics

Rotation period 

A rotational lightcurve of Akka was obtained from photoelectric observation made by Polish astronomer Wiesław Wiśniewski of the University of Arizona in August 1992. The ambiguous lightcurve gave a rotation period of  hours with a brightness variation of 0.46 in magnitude. Alternatively, the body rotates once every  hours (or half the previous period) with an amplitude of 0.52, as determined by Czech astronomer Petr Pravec.

Diameter and albedo 

According to Spitzer's "NEOSurvey", a follow up to the "ExploreNEOs" program, Akka measures 0.540 kilometers in diameter and its surface has a high albedo of 0.33. The Collaborative Asteroid Lightcurve Link assumes a standard albedo for stony asteroids of 0.20 and calculates a diameter of 0.7 kilometers with an absolute magnitude of 18.148.

Naming 

This minor planet was named after Akka from Finnish mythology. She is the Earth's mother and the goddess of harvest and personifies love, agriculture and femininity. Akka is the wife of the principal sky deity Ukko, after whom the minor planet 2020 Ukko is named. The official naming citation was published by the Minor Planet Center on 24 July 2002.

References

External links 
 Asteroid Lightcurve Database (LCDB), query form (info )
 Dictionary of Minor Planet Names, Google books
 Asteroids and comets rotation curves, CdR Observatoire de Genève, Raoul Behrend
 
 
 

008034
Discoveries by Carolyn S. Shoemaker
Discoveries by Eugene Merle Shoemaker
Named minor planets
Earth-crossing asteroids
19920603